The Nicaraguan lunar sample displays are two commemorative plaques consisting of small fragments of Moon specimen brought back with the Apollo 11 and Apollo 17 Moon missions and given in the 1970s to the people of Nicaragua by United States President Richard Nixon as goodwill gifts.

Description

Apollo 11

Apollo 17

History 
The Nicaragua Apollo 11 lunar plaque display was reported stolen, but was returned to Nicaragua in 2012.

See also
 List of Apollo lunar sample displays

References

Further reading

External links
 Partial list of Apollo  11, 12, 14, 15, 16, and 17 sample locations, NASA Johnson Space Center

Stolen and missing moon rocks
Nicaragua–United States relations